Sir Patrick Michael Ernest David McNair-Wilson (born 28 May 1929) is a British former Conservative Member of Parliament and consultant.

Early life and career 
McNair-Wilson is the son of Dr Robert McNair-Wilson. He was educated at Eton College and was commissioned in the Coldstream Guards from 1947 to 1952, serving in Palestine and North Africa. From 1951 to 1953, he was an executive at the French Shipping Company.

He joined the staff of Conservative Central Office in 1954, working for them until 1958. He became a director of the London Municipal Society in 1961, remaining in the role until 1963. In the same period, he was editor of The Londoner. He was also a broadcaster.

McNair-Wilson was the member of parliament for Lewisham West from 1964 until he lost the seat to Labour in 1966. He then won the 1968 by-election in the New Forest constituency, representing this safe Conservative seat until his retirement in 1997.

Honours 
In 1989, McNair-Wilson was awarded a knighthood.

Personal life 

He is the elder brother of the late Sir Michael McNair-Wilson, former MP for Newbury. His niece, Laura Farris, was elected as the MP for Newbury at the 2019 general election.

In 1953, McNair-Wilson married Diana Evelyn Kitty Campbell Methuen-Campbell, the daughter of the Hon. Laurence Methuen-Campbell. She died in 2015. The couple have five children: Jennifer, Arabella, Anne, Guy and Kate. He also has four grandchildren, Lily, Jack, Edie and Charlie. McNair-Wilson's recreations are sailing, pottery and flying. He lives on a farm in Beaulieu, Hampshire.

References

The Times Guide to the House of Commons, Times Newspapers Ltd, 1966 & 1997

External links 
 

 

1929 births
Living people
Coldstream Guards officers
Conservative Party (UK) MPs for English constituencies
Knights Bachelor
People educated at Eton College
Politicians awarded knighthoods
UK MPs 1964–1966
UK MPs 1966–1970
UK MPs 1970–1974
UK MPs 1974
UK MPs 1974–1979
UK MPs 1979–1983
UK MPs 1983–1987
UK MPs 1987–1992
UK MPs 1992–1997